Alessio Cavatore is a game designer.

Early life and education
Alessio Cavatore was born in Turin, Italy, on Valentine's Day, 1972.

Career
In 1995 Cavatore moved to Nottingham (U.K.) to work for Games Workshop. He wrote several supplements for Warhammer Fantasy Battle before heading up the Lord of the Rings Strategy Battle Game. In 2004 Cavatore was made responsible for all rules material published for the company's three main tabletop systems — Warhammer, Warhammer 40,000, and The Lord of the Rings — and, in 2006, he wrote the rules for a new edition of Warhammer.

Working closely with Rick Priestley, Cavatore has been a designer for Games Workshop's tabletop hobby wargames.

Mordheim (1999) was designed by Alessio Cavatore, Tuomas Pirinen and Rick Priestley. Kings of War (2009) was designed by Cavatore.

Alessio Cavatore had a cameo appearance in The Return of the King film as Rohirrim at the Battle of the Pelennor Fields, alongside Games Workshop designers Alan Perry, Michael Perry and Brian Nelson. They can be seen near the Mumakil Peregrin Took goes searching for Meriadoc Brandybuck among the debris from the battle, and are also on the base of Games Workshop's Mûmak miniature.

In 2010, he founded River Horse to publish his own games and to collaborate as a consultant with many other well-known publishers in the gaming industry.

With River Horse Origins awards winner Alessio Cavatore has designed or co-designed many miniatures wargames and board games – titles like Deus Vult, Shuuro, Loka, Waterloo - Quelle Affaire!, Terminator Genisys, etc.; not to mention a plethora of expansions and other type of supplements and support material for these systems.

He is the lead game designer for Para Bellum Games' Conquest: The Last Argument of Kings and Conquest: First Blood.

Works

Games Workshop
Warmaster (with Rick Priestley and Stephan Hess) 
The Lord of the Rings Strategy Battle Game (with Rick Priestley)

Warlord Games
 Bolt Action (With Rick Priestley)

River Horse 
Shuuro
Loka
The Tarot of Loka
Waterloo - Quelle Affaire
Terminator Genisys: The Miniatures Game
Jim Henson's Labyrinth: The Board Game
My Little Pony Tails of Equestria: The Storytelling Game

References

External links
 Meet the Moderators

1972 births
Games Workshop
Living people